Tour Languedoc Roussillon was a women's staged cycle race which took place in France and was rated by the UCI as 2.2.

Overall winners

References

Cycle races in France
Women's road bicycle races
2013 in road cycling
May 2013 sports events in France